Chevereșu Mare is a commune in Timiș County, Romania. It is composed of three villages: Chevereșu Mare (commune seat), Dragșina and Vucova.

Geography 
Chevereșu Mare is located in the central-southern part of Timiș County, in the place where three plains meet: the hilly plain of Gătaia, the gulf of Lugoj and the low plain of Timiș. It borders the commune of Racovița and the town of Buziaș to the east, the commune of Nițchidorf to the south, the communes of Sacoșu Turcesc and Moșnița Nouă to the west and the commune of Remetea Mare and the town of Recaș to the north.

Hydrography 

The Timiș River is the northern border of the commune. Chevereșu Mare is crossed by a small canalized stream called Șurgani (locally Șorcan). It springs northwest of Buziaș, in the Dumbrava Forest, flowing into the Timiș River, on the left side, just upstream from the strand at Albina. A dry arm of Șurgani, Vâna, crosses the Corneanț neighborhood. In the past, Chevereșu Mare also had a lake, Hergheșceu, dried up after the land improvement works of 1969–1970.

History 
The first recorded mention of Chevereșu Mare dates from the end of the Turkish occupation of Banat and is made by Marsigli in his writings from 1690, where he mentions the village of Keveris in the district of Ciacova. The village is certainly older and was inhabited by Romanians when, in 1717, the Austrians conquered Banat. With the establishment of the post office in 1721, Chevereșu Mare became an administrative center for the surrounding localities and even for some more distant ones. Here was the headquarters of an administrative sub-office and a forest district. Until 1808 Chevereșu Mare was a chamber property and a revenue office.

The local tradition speaks of three hamlets that merged, during the reign of Maria Theresa, on the current hearth of the settlement: Corneanț (the nucleus of the future settlement), Bocea (the largest one) and Drila. Corneanț was located where today is the homonymous neighborhood, in the south of the village. Bocea was further north, at the edge of the forest, between Dragșina and Sârbova. The village of Potchia appeared on old Austrian maps until 1750. Today, Bocea is the neighborhood that occupies the northern part of the settlement. The contemporary Regat neighborhood, located in the northwest, was called, until the interwar period, Drila.

Demographics 

Chevereșu Mare had a population of 2,272 inhabitants at the 2011 census, up 19% from the 2002 census. Most inhabitants are Romanians (61.09%), larger minorities being represented by Roma (19.32%), Hungarians (8.27%) and Slovaks (4.45%). For 6.43% of the population, ethnicity is unknown. By religion, most inhabitants are Orthodox (73.06%), but there are also minorities of Roman Catholics (11.75%), Pentecostals (6.25%) and Lutherans (1.63%). For 6.43% of the population, religious affiliation is unknown.

Culture

Churches 
The Orthodox church, built in 1801 in the Bocea neighborhood, is dedicated to the Ascension of Jesus. It replaces and older church of twigs that was located in the Corneanț neighborhood, together with the old cemetery, on the greenfield called Plațu Bicii. The Roman Catholic church, located on Drumu Mare (the main street), is dedicated to King Saint Stephen and is a branch of the parish of Bacova; it was built around 1869. 

Vucova has a Lutheran church built in 1852 by the Slovaks colonized here in the first half of the 19th century.

References 

Communes in Timiș County
Localities in Romanian Banat